Carex digitata, finger sedge, or fingered sedge is a species in the genus Carex, native to Europe and western Asia. It is found most often in shady, deciduous mesotrophic oakhornbeam forests.

References

digitata
Plants described in 1753